Alfred Brian Bainbridge (born 15 October 1932, Middlesbrough, Yorkshire) is a former English first-class cricketer, who played five games for Yorkshire between 1961 and 1963. He was a right-arm off-break bowler, who took 20 wickets at an average of 17.90, with a match-winning best of 6 for 58 and 6 for 53 in Yorkshire's 52-run win over Essex at St George's Road Cricket Ground, Harrogate in 1961.  A right-handed lower order batsman, he scored 93 runs at 9.30, with a best score of 24.

He appeared for Yorkshire's Second XI between 1954 and 1963, and played for Northamptonshire Second XI in 1960.

References

External links
 

1932 births
Living people
Yorkshire cricketers
Durham cricketers
Cricketers from Middlesbrough
English cricketers
English cricketers of 1946 to 1968